Hong Kong Virtual University (HKVU, 香港虛擬大學), formerly known Cyber University, started in 2001, is one of collaborative programs funded by Restructuring and Collaboration Fund of the University Grants Committee. It aims to provide a virtual campus for Hong Kong tertiary institutions and universities. The students who either study in or will enter these institutions are allowed to take the online courses offered by HKVU. The courses are jointly provided by the Hong Kong University of Science and Technology, City University of Hong Kong, Lingnan University, The Hong Kong Institute of Education, and The University of Hong Kong.

These courses cover four areas: general education, information technology, language, and science and education.

History
The project was initiated by Dr. Pong Ting Chuen (龐鼎全博士) in 2001; he is professor of computer science and associate vice-president for academic affairs of Hong Kong University of Science and Technology. The project allows gifted and talented students to take university-level courses over the internet, enriches the learning experience of participants and makes a smooth transition from secondary school to university.

Before the project launch, secondary schools were encouraged to apply information technology in education. However, there were many complaints on low performance and low use of facilities. Some schools asked universities for help. A pilot study was started in fall 2000 in which 28 students from three schools participated. Those students were required to attend one of six cyber classrooms in secondary schools. Those courses were delivered through an eLearning Open Platform (eLOP). Those students watched the video lectures, asked instructors questions and performed online tasks over eLOP. After the pilot study, the project gained funding from Quality Education Fund (優質教育基金) of Hong Kong.

Since 2001, there have been over 100 schools participated in the project such as the Canadian International School, Diocesan Girls' School, King's College, La Salle College, Marymount School, Pui Ching Middle School, St. Paul's Convent School, Wah Yan College, Hong Kong, Wah Yan College, Kowloon.

Programs

Credit Bearing Program
Credit Bearing Program is a series of courses for undergraduates from local tertiary institutes, secondary school students, and overseas students. Credit units will be earned after fulfilled the passing requirements including "attendance" of video lectures, some scores obtained from online tests, quizzes, assignment, group discussion, laboratories and examination.

Talented Youth Certificate Program
Talented Youth Certificate Program is a series of courses mainly for secondary school students, especially talented ones. These courses are developed from regular university courses with less demanding work schedule. These talented youths can explore and develop their own interests. It is also a platform to build up a community of talents in Hong Kong.

Chemists Online Program
Chemists Online Program was a collaborative project between universities and secondary schools in Hong Kong. In 2011, the program was funded by the Quality Education Fund. Leading by Lok Sin Tong Young Ko Hsiao Lin Secondary School and Hong Kong Virtual University, the project had organised 18 seminars covering a wide range of chemistry topics, including synthetic polymers, gastronomy, nanomaterials and food chemistry. The content links with the senior secondary Chemistry curriculum and extends to the latest advances in chemistry.

Chemists Online Self-study Award Scheme
In 2014, the idea of Chemists Online Program was extended to be Chemists Online Self-study Award Scheme. In 2015, the course content was migrated to another learning management platform called Open Canvas. In Q4 of 2016, the scheme was offered to the HKMOOC platform which was designed to cope with the large scale of usage.

ExCEL Summer Program
Exploration Centric Experiential Learning program (ExCEL Summer Program) aimed to provide secondary school students opportunities to: explore different disciplines at the university level via innovative blended and experiential learning approaches, get a taste of university education, enhance students' learning profile, strengthen critical thinking skills in knowledge discovery, and earn academic credits from university level courses. The students who had completed both the online and face-to-face session of the single registered course can receive HKUST credits.

e-STEAM@Home Award Scheme
e-STEAM@Home Award Scheme was a self-paced student-centered learning program for primary and secondary school students to self-learn at home. The Scheme was offered by HKUST's Hong Kong Virtual University (HKVU) program in partnership with Hong Kong Education City (HKEdCity) and HKUST-Lee Kum Kee Happy Family Learning Center (HFLC). In April 2020, there were 12 online courses offered under the Scheme.

Courses
Introduction to Communication Studies (City U)
Introduction to Cognitive Science (HKU)
Mathematical Problem Solving Techniques (HKIED)
Exploring Multimedia and Internet Computing (HKUST)
Computer and Programming Fundamentals I (HKUST)
Computer and Programming Fundamentals II (HKUST)
Science, Technology and Society (HKUST)
Critical Thinking (Lingnan University)

Awards
Hong Kong Virtual University program was the first runner up in the Hybrid Learning Category of the Wharton-QS Stars Awards. The Chemists Online program also won the Natural Sciences Award. The Wharton School and QS recognize HKVU as “an outstanding contribution to innovation in learning".

See also
Online education
Higher education in Hong Kong
Education in Hong Kong

References

External links
Hong Kong Virtual University

Universities in Hong Kong
Virtual learning environments